WPIN is a sports formatted broadcast radio station licensed to Dublin, Virginia, serving the New River Valley.  WPIN is owned and operated by Baker Family Stations.

810 AM is United States clear-channel frequency, on which KGO in San Francisco, California and WGY in Schenectady, New York are the dominant Class A stations.  WPIN (AM) must leave the air from sunset to sunrise to prevent interference with the Class A stations nighttime skywave signals.

The station's flagship local sports program is "The Drive", hosted by veteran radio personality Paul Van Wagoner, alongside Virginia Tech alumni Andrew Alix and producer Nathan Brennan. It also serves as the radio home of Carolina Panthers football and Blacksburg High School athletics.

FM Translators
In addition the main station at 810 kHz, WPIN is relayed by two FM translators in order to widen its broadcast area, especially at night when the AM frequency is off the air.

References

External links
ESPN Blacksburg Online

1995 establishments in Virginia
Sports radio stations in the United States
ESPN Radio stations
Radio stations established in 1995
PIN